Tikka may refer to:

 Tikka (food), a type of South Asian food
 Tikka (forehead mark), a mark made on the forehead by Hindu Indians

 Tikka, a brand of hunting rifles manufactured formerly by Finnish firearms manufacturer Tikkakoski
  Tikka, the brand then owned by SAKO
 Tikka, a brand of headlamps by Petzl

People

Tikka is a surname originating in Finland (in Finnish, it means "woodpecker"), and a surname originating in Hindustan (before the partition of India and Pakistan).
 Tikka Khan (1915-2002), Pakistani military general
 Iqbal Tikka (died 2021), Pakistani politician
 Kari S. Tikka (1944–2006), Finnish legal scholar, professor of finance law
 Pertti Tikka (living), Finnish ski-orienteer, world champion
 Pia Tikka (born 1961), Finnish film director and screenwriter
 Taneli Tikka (born 1978), Finnish entrepreneur in technology

See also
 Pratap Singh (Sikh prince) (1831–1843) or Tikka Sahib
 Ticker (disambiguation)

Surnames of Finnish origin
Finnish-language surnames
Surnames of Hindustani origin
Urdu-language surnames
Pakistani names